Gizem Örge (born 26 April 1993) is a Turkish female volleyball player. Currently, she plays in the Turkish Women's Volleyball League for Fenerbahçe as libero with jersey number 1. She was part of the Turkey women's national volleyball team, which became champion at the 2014 Women's European Volleyball League.

Personal life
Örge is a student of physical education and sports at Marmara University. On 31 July 2017, she married actor Cavit Çetin Güner and they divorced 23 September 2019.

Career

Clubs
She began her sports career in her hometown Ankara. After obtaining her license, she played in the girls' team of Ankara Eczacı Spor that became runner-up in the Turkish Championship. Then, she was admitted to the women's team, and enjoyed her team's promotion to the Turkish Women's Volleyball Second League.

Still a high school student, Örge transferred to Nilüfer Belediyespor in Bursa in the 2008–09 season. After her transfer to Vakıfbank, she was loaned out to Nilüfer Belediyespor.

In the 2013–14 season, she joined Vakıfbank team, and successfully replaced the team's injured libero Gizem Güreşen Karadayı. She won the champion title in the 2013–14 Turkish Women's Volleyball League season with Vakıfbank, and became runner-up in the 2013–14 CEV Women's Champions League.

In 2021-22 season, she transferred to Fenerbahçe team.

National team
She was member of the Turkey women's national volleyball team, which won the 2014 Women's European Volleyball League.

Awards

National team
 2014 Women's European Volleyball League - 
 2015 FIVB Volleyball Women's U23 World Championship -

Clubs
 2013–14 Turkish Women's Volleyball League -  champion with Vakıfbank
 2013–14 CEV Women's Champions League -  runner-up with Vakıfbank
 2013–14 Turkish Cup –  Champion, with Vakıfbank
 2014–15 Turkish Cup –  Runner-up, with Vakıfbank
 2015–16 CEV Women's Champions League -  runner-up with Vakıfbank
 2016–17 CEV Women's Champions League -  champion with Vakıfbank
 2016–17 Turkish Cup –  Runner-up, with Vakıfbank
 2017 Club World Championship -  champion with Vakıfbank
 2017–18 CEV Women's Champions League -  champion with Vakıfbank
 2017–18 Turkish Cup –  Champion, with Vakıfbank
 2018 Club World Championship -  champion with Vakıfbank
 2020–21 CEV Women's Champions League -  runner-up with Vakıfbank
 2020–21 Turkish Cup –  Champion, with Vakıfbank
 2020–21 Turkish Women's Volleyball League –  Champion, with Vakıfbank
 2021–22 Turkish Women's Volleyball League –  runner-up with Fenerbahçe
 2021–22 Turkish Cup –  runner-up with Fenerbahçe
 2021–22 Turkish Super Cup -  Champion, with Fenerbahçe

Individuals
2015 U23 World Championship "Best Libero"
2017-18 CEV Champions League "Best Libero"
''2018 Club World Championship "Best Libero"

See also
Turkish women in sports

References

External links

 Gizem Orge at the International Volleyball Federation
 
 Gizem Örge at VakıfBank Sports Club
 

1993 births
Sportspeople from Ankara
Marmara University alumni
Turkish women's volleyball players
Nilüfer Belediyespor volleyballers
VakıfBank S.K. volleyballers
Living people
Turkey women's international volleyball players